Alexander Claudio (born January 31, 1992) is a Puerto Rican professional baseball pitcher in the Milwaukee Brewers organization. He has played in Major League Baseball (MLB) for the Texas Rangers, Brewers, Los Angeles Angels and New York Mets. Claudio pitches in an unorthodox sidearm manner.

Career

Texas Rangers
Claudio attended Isabel Flores High School in Juncos, Puerto Rico. Claudio was drafted by the Texas Rangers in the 27th round of the 2010 MLB draft.

Claudio spent his first professional season of 2010 playing for the AZL Rangers of the Rookie-level Arizona League, going 0–1 with a 6.60 ERA in 15 innings. He split the 2011 season Between the AZL Rangers and the Spokane Indians of the Class A Short Season Northwest League, going a combined 5–0 with a 1.91 ERA over 28 innings. He returned to the AZL Rangers in 2012, going 4–0 with a 1.79 ERA over 45 innings. Following the 2012 season, Claudio converted from a traditional over the top pitching delivery to a sidearm delivery.

Claudio played for the Hickory Crawdads of the Class A South Atlantic League and the Frisco RoughRiders of the Double-A Texas League in 2013, going a combined 4–6 with a 1.83 ERA over  innings. He split the 2014 minor league season between the Myrtle Beach Pelicans of the Class A-Advanced Carolina League, Frisco, and the Round Rock Express of the Triple-A Pacific Coast League, combining to go 6–3 with a 1.66 ERA over  innings.

The Rangers selected Claudio's contract and promoted him to the major leagues for the first time on August 13, 2014. He pitched a scoreless inning, and struck out Kevin Kiermaier for his first major league strikeout in his debut that night. He went 0–0 with a 2.92 ERA over 12 innings for Texas in 2014.

Claudio split the 2015 season between Texas and Round Rock. With the Rangers, he went 1–1 with a 2.87 ERA over 15.2 innings. With Round Rock, he went 3–1 with a 2.93 ERA over 40 innings. Claudio once again split the season between Texas and Round Rock in 2016. With the Rangers, he went 4–1 with a 2.79 ERA in  innings. With Round Rock, he went 0–0 with a 0.55 ERA in 16 innings.

Claudio was named the 2017 Texas Rangers Pitcher of the Year, following a season where he posted a 4–1 record with a 2.50 ERA, 56 strikeouts, and 11 saves over  innings in 70 games.

In 2018, Claudio went 4–2 with a 4.48 ERA over 68 innings. Right-handed batters had a higher batting average against him, .359, than against all other MLB pitchers in 30 or more innings.

Milwaukee Brewers
Claudio was traded to the Milwaukee Brewers on December 13, 2018, in exchange for a competitive balance Round A draft pick. In 2019, he posted a 2–2 record with a 4.06 ERA over 62 innings. He led all major league pitchers in games played (83). Claudio was non-tendered and became a free agent on December 2, 2019. He re-signed with Milwaukee on a one-year contract on December 9, 2019. Claudio made 20 appearances for the Brewers in 2020, recording a 4.26 ERA with 15 strikeouts and 6 walks in 19.0 innings of work. On December 2, 2020, Claudio was non-tendered by the Brewers and became a free agent.

Los Angeles Angels
On December 16, 2020, Claudio signed a one-year, $1.125 million deal with the Los Angeles Angels. On July 25, 2021, Claudio was designated for assignment by the Angels after struggling to a 5.51 ERA across 41 appearances. He was released on July 30, 2021.

Boston Red Sox
On August 10, 2021, Claudio signed minor league deal with the Boston Red Sox. He was assigned to the Triple-A Worcester Red Sox.
Claudio made 8 appearances for Worcester, recording a 6.17 ERA with 13 strikeouts. On September 21, the Red Sox released Claudio.

New York Mets
On January 13, 2022, Claudio signed a minor league contract with the New York Mets. He had his contract selected on September 7, 2022. On September 30, Claudio was designated for assignment.

Milwaukee Brewers (second stint)
On January 3, 2023, Claudio signed a minor league contract with the Milwaukee Brewers organization.

International career
Claudio was a member of the 2017 Puerto Rico national baseball team in the 2017 World Baseball Classic.

See also
 List of Major League Baseball players from Puerto Rico

References

External links

1992 births
Living people
People from Juncos, Puerto Rico
Sportspeople from San Juan, Puerto Rico
Major League Baseball pitchers
Major League Baseball players from Puerto Rico
Texas Rangers players
Milwaukee Brewers players
Los Angeles Angels players
New York Mets players
Arizona League Rangers players
Spokane Indians players
Hickory Crawdads players
Myrtle Beach Pelicans players
Frisco RoughRiders players
Round Rock Express players
Leones de Ponce players
Indios de Mayagüez players
Worcester Red Sox players
2017 World Baseball Classic players